This is a list of firearm cartridges which have bullets in the  to  caliber range.

All measurements are in mm (in).

Rimfire cartridges

Centerfire cartridges

Pistol and PDW cartridges

Revolver cartridges

Rifle cartridges

See also
.177 caliber

References

Pistol and rifle cartridges
Rimfire cartridges